Browns Valley (also, Brown's Valley) is an unincorporated community in Yuba County, California.

History 

Before the establishment of the Browns Valley community, the land was the home to the Concow Maidu and the Nisenan people. 

In the fall of 1849, gold was found in the township of Long Bar and along the Yuba River, only 3 miles away from Browns Valley. The name of the community was in honor of a settler who arrived in 1850 and discovered gold here. In the early days of mining in this area, gold was extracted in many different ways including hydraulic mining. The mines had to be continuous monitored because competition was high, and people would try to steal mining claims. Initially the area mined for gold, and when that ran out they mined quartz (which sometimes would encase the gold). The Chinese and Irish immigrants that came to the area for mining work, and also worked to built rock walls across many areas of Browns Valley.

Browns Valley was the home of the Sweet Vengeance Mine, founded by six African American men. Other African American mining operations in the community included the Rare Ripe Gold and Silver Mining Company (also known as the Rare Ripe Company); and the Horncut Mine. In 1868, the Rare Ripe Gold and Silver Mining Company incorporated, and had an office in Maryville.

In 1863, Tensions grew over the land in this area between miners, ranchers, and Native Americans; and there was a forced removal of Native Americans to a reservation in Mendocino County. A post office was established at Browns Valley in 1864.

See also 
 African Americans in California

References

Unincorporated communities in California
Populated places established in 1850
1850 establishments in California
Unincorporated communities in Yuba County, California